Thomas Medard Hagan (born January 29, 1947) was an American basketball player who played briefly in the original American Basketball Association (ABA).

Hagan played college basketball at Vanderbilt and played for the Dallas Chaparrals and Kentucky Colonels of the ABA.  He appeared in 73 total ABA games, averaging 4.9 points and 1.9 assists per game.

References

1947 births
Living people
American men's basketball players
Basketball players from Louisville, Kentucky
Dallas Chaparrals players
Kentucky Colonels players
Point guards
San Francisco Warriors draft picks
Shooting guards
Texas Chaparrals players
Vanderbilt Commodores men's basketball players